Shamshir (also Romanized as Shamshīr) is a village in Shamshir Rural District, in the Central District of Paveh County, Kermanshah Province, Iran. At the 2006 census, its population was 2,097, in 493 families.

References 

Populated places in Paveh County